The FIL World Luge Championships 2011 took place 28–30 January 2011 in Cesana, Italy at the Cesana Pariol bobsleigh, luge, and skeleton track. A total of 19 countries competed.

Medalists

Men's singles
Germany's Felix Loch is the defending Olympic and world champion in this event. The event took place on 29 January at 15:00 CET. Zöggeler came from 0.057 seconds down after the first run to defeat defending world champion Loch by 0.021 seconds. It was the Italian's sixth world championship overall, but his first since the 2005 championships in Park City, Utah in the United States where Zöggeler won his 2002 Olympic gold medal.

37 athletes from 18 countries competed.

Women's singles
Erin Hamlin of the United States in the defending world champion while Germany's Tatjana Hüfner in the defending Olympic champion. The event took place on 29 January at 08:20 CET.

26 athletes from 13 countries competed.

Hüfner rebounded from her disappointing finish at the 2009 championships with her third gold medal in this event. Defending champion Hamlin finished 14th. Geisenberger won her third straight silver in this event. Gough becomes the first Canadian woman to medal at the World Championships and the second Canadian overall after Miroslav Zajonc's gold in the men's singles event at the 1983 championships.

Men's doubles
Italy's Gerhard Plankensteiner and Oswald Haselrieder are the defending world champions. Austria's Andreas and Wolfgang Linger are the two-time defending Olympic champions. Plankensteiner and Haselrieder retired between the 2010 Winter Olympics and the start of the 2010-11 Luge World Cup. The first run of the event will take place on 29 January at 19:00 CET while the second run will take place at 09:00 CET the next day.

Mixed team relay
The German team of Loch, Natalie Geisenberger, André Florschütz, and Torsten Wustlich were the defending world champions. The event was to have taken place on 30 January at 10:20 CET, but was cancelled due to technical problems.

Medal table

References

 (30 June 2007 article updated 23 December 2009.)

External links
Official website. 

2011 in Italian sport
FIL World Luge Championships
International sports competitions hosted by Italy
Province of Turin
2011 in luge
Luge in Italy